Justice Whitfield may refer to:

Albert H. Whitfield, associate justice of the Supreme Court of Mississippi
James B. Whitfield, chief justice of the Supreme Court of Florida